The Preston House near Milton, Kentucky was built around 1840.  It was listed on the National Register of Historic Places in 1983.

It was deemed a significant example of vernacular Greek Revival architecture.

References

National Register of Historic Places in Trimble County, Kentucky
Greek Revival houses in Kentucky
Houses completed in 1840
1840 establishments in Kentucky
Houses on the National Register of Historic Places in Kentucky
Houses in Trimble County, Kentucky